Henry's Dress was an American noise pop band from Albuquerque, New Mexico (and later from San Francisco, California), consisting of Amy Linton (later of The Aislers Set) and Matt Hartman, who both acted as singer, guitarist and drummer at various times, and Hayyim Sanchez as bassist, which was formed in 1993. They were signed to Slumberland Records before disbanding in 1997.

Discography
"1620" (7", Wish I Was a Slumberland Record, November 1993)
"Astronautical Music Festival" (Split 7" w/ Tiger Trap, Slumberland Records, February 1994)
"Henry's Dress" (10", Slumberland Records, April 1995)
"All This Time for Nothing" (Split 7" w/ Flake, 1995)
Bust 'em Green (LP, Slumberland Records, March 1996)
"Over 21" (Split 7" w/ Rocketship, Wish I Was a Slumberland Record, May 1996)

References

External links
Epitonic bio
May 1996 interview by Cool Beans

Musical groups from San Francisco
Noise pop musical groups
Slumberland Records artists